Canadian Western Bank (CWB), also operating as CWB Financial Group, is a Canadian bank based in Edmonton, Alberta. The bank serves clients both in Western Canada and in other provinces.

The CWB Financial Group is made up of 10 banking, lending, wealth and trust companies. Its loan book is almost equally represented across BC, Alberta and Ontario. As part of its expansion plans, CWB has opened a branch in Mississauga, Ontario, just west of Toronto.

History
Canadian Western Bank was formed through the 1988 merger of two banks: the Bank of Alberta (founded 1984), and the Western & Pacific Bank of Canada (founded 1982). It was led by Bank of Alberta co-founders Charles Alexander Allard and Eugene Pechet.

In 1993, it acquired Western Canadian branches of Metropolitan Trust. In 1994, Canadian Western Bank and North West Trust Company merged into Canadian Western Bank. In 1996, it acquired BC Bancorp (chartered in 1967), and purchased the Aetna Trust Company, which was renamed Canadian Western Trust Company.  In 2001, it acquired the Kelowna and Regina branches of the Laurentian Bank of Canada.

Acquisition history

 Western Canadian branches of Metropolitan Trust, 1993
 Acquired BC Bancorp (chartered 1967), 1996
 Aetna Trust Company, 1996 - renamed Canadian Western Trust Company 1996
 Kelowna and Regina branches of Laurentian Bank, 2001
 Canadian Direct Insurance Inc. (CDII), 2004
 Valiant Trust Company, 2004
 Branch of National Bank of Greece (Canada), 2005
 National Leasing, 2010
 Maxium Group, 2016
 iA Investment Counsel Inc., 2020

Operations

Canadian Western Bank's operating affiliates include:
 Motive Financial (100% ownership) – high-interest savings accounts, GICs, and TFSAs.  Before 2017, it was called Canadian Direct Financial.
 Canadian Western Financial Ltd. (100% ownership) – mutual fund dealer.
 Canadian Western Trust Company (100% ownership) – personal and corporate trust services. Optimum Mortgage is a division of Canadian Western Trust Company and offers residential mortgages via a network of mortgage brokers.  
 National Leasing Group Inc. (100% ownership) – commercial equipment leasing. 
 Valiant Trust Company (100% ownership) – specialty trust services including stock transfer, corporate trust, escrow and employee plan services.
 CWB Wealth Management (previously Adroit Investment Management Ltd (76.5% ownership) – investment and wealth management.

Motive Financial
Motive Financial is the virtual banking division of Canadian Western Bank. As such, eligible deposits are held at Canadian Western Bank, a member of Canada Deposit Insurance Corporation (CDIC). Motive Financial is an online bank.

Motive serves customers in all provinces except Quebec. Accounts can be opened online. Deposits and withdrawals can be made using one of The Exchange ATM network’s 2400 ATMs. Debit-card purchases can be made using the Interac network. Transfers to and from other banks may be done by electronic funds transfer (EFT), by Interac e-Transfer, or by writing cheques. Because Motive offers no in-branch services, it offers higher interest rates than conventional banks.

Motive Financial was founded in 1984 and is based in Edmonton. It was founded in 2008 as Canadian Direct Financial. On April 18, 2017, they rebranded to become Motive Financial.

Membership
Canadian Western Bank is a member of the Canada Deposit Insurance Corporation (CDIC). It also belongs to the Cirrus, Interac, Mastercard, and The Exchange interbank networks.

See also

List of banks and credit unions in Canada
Canadian Western Bank v Alberta

References

External links

Motive Financial

Companies listed on the Toronto Stock Exchange
Banks of Canada
Financial services companies based in Alberta
Companies based in Edmonton
Banks established in 1988
1988 establishments in Alberta